"It's Passion" is a debut single recorded by American electro-soul band The System. The song, written by Mic Murphy, David Frank, was released in 1982 by Mirage Records. The song is also included in their 1983 album Sweat. It was a club hit that reached number 23 on the Billboard Club/Dance charts.

Track listing

1982 release  
12" vinyl
 US: Mirage / DMD-384

Personnel 
 Producer: Mic Murphy, David Frank
 Songwriter: Mic Murphy, David Frank
 Produced by Mic Murphy and David Frank for Science Lab Productions.

Chart performance

References 

1982 debut singles
The System (band) songs
Songs written by David Frank (musician)
1982 songs
Songs written by Mic Murphy
Mirage Records singles